Stubblefield may refer to:

Places
 Stubblefield, Illinois, an unincorporated community in Bond County, Illinois, United States
 Stubblefield, Texas, a location in Houston County, Texas, United States
Stubblefield, Johnson County, Texas

People with the surname
 Al Stubblefield, president and CEO of Baptist Health Care
 Blaine Stubblefield (1896–1960), an American archivist of folk songs
 Christopher B. "Stubb" Stubblefield (1931–1995), an American barbecue restaurateur
 Clyde Stubblefield (1943–2017), an American drummer
 Cyril James Stubblefield (1901–1999), a British geologist
 Dana Stubblefield (born 1970), a former American football player
 Frank Stubblefield (1907–1977), an American politician
 Gary Stubblefield (born 1951), an American politician
 Ike Stubblefield (born 1952), an American musician
 John Stubblefield (1945–2005), an American jazz saxophonist, flautist, and oboist
 Mickey Stubblefield (1926–2013), Negro league baseball player
 Nathan Stubblefield (1860–1928), an American inventor and farmer
 Peter Stubblefield (1888–1966), American politician and Mississippi state senator
 Stubby Stubblefield (1909–1935), an American racecar driver
 Taylor Stubblefield (born 1982), a former American football player
 Tony Stubblefield (born 1970), an American college assistant basketball coach

Fictional character

 Edward "Stubbs" Stubblefield, the eponymous main character of the 2006 video game Stubbs the Zombie in Rebel Without a Pulse